Life Time is the debut album by American drummer Tony Williams recorded in 1964 and released on the Blue Note label. Featured musicians include tenor saxophonist Sam Rivers, vibraphonist Bobby Hutcherson, pianist Herbie Hancock and bassists Gary Peacock and Richard Davis.

Reception
The Allmusic review by Scott Yanow awarded the album 4½ stars and stated "The unpredictable music holds one's interest; a very strong debut for the masterful drummer".

The Penguin Guide to Jazz Recordings included the album in its suggested “core collection” of essential recordings.

Track listing
All compositions by Tony Williams.
 "Two Pieces of One: Red" – 8:06
 "Two Pieces of One: Green" – 10:40
 "Tomorrow Afternoon" – 5:35
 "Memory" – 8:06
 "Barb's Song to the Wizard" – 5:58

Recorded on August 21 (#1–3) and August 24 (#4–5), 1964.

Personnel
Tony Williams – drums, timpani, woodblocks, maracas, triangle (1–4)
Sam Rivers – tenor saxophone (1–3)
Bobby Hutcherson – vibes, marimba (4)
Herbie Hancock – piano (4–5)
Ron Carter (5), Richard Davis (1–2), Gary Peacock (1–3) – bass

References

Blue Note Records albums
Tony Williams (drummer) albums
1964 debut albums
Albums recorded at Van Gelder Studio
Albums produced by Alfred Lion